A list of films produced by the Israeli film industry in 1968.

1968 releases

See also
1968 in Israel

References

External links
 Israeli films of 1968 at the Internet Movie Database

Lists of 1968 films by country or language
Film
1968